Barrah bint Abd al-Uzza ibn Uthman ibn Abd-al-Dar ibn Qusai ibn Kilab (of the Banu Abd ad-Dar), was the maternal grandmother of Islamic prophet Muhammad.

Family

The mother of Barrah was Um Habib bint Asad ibn Abd-al-Uzza ibn Qusai ibn Kilab and her father was Abdul Uzza ibn Othman ibn Abd-al-Dar ibn Qusai. Therefore, Barrah's mother and father were second cousins. Moreover, Barra was a cousin of Khadija (first wife of the Prophet Muhammad) since her mother, Um Habib, was a sister of Khadija's father, Khuwaylid ibn Asad. Furthermore, the mother of Um Habib was Barrah bint Awf ibn Abid ibn Awij ibn Adiy ibn Ka'ab ibn Lu'ay ibn Ghalib; this was the maternal grandmother of Barrah bint Abdul Uzza.

See also
Family tree of Muhammad

References

Sources

Ibn Hisham's Prophet Muhammad's biography (Arabic)

6th-century deaths
Year of death unknown
Year of birth unknown
6th-century women
6th-century Arabs
Ancestors of Muhammad